Satoru Kobayashi may refer to:

, Japanese film director
, Japanese footballer
, Japanese Go player